The 2009 Pepsi 500 was the thirtieth race of the 2009 NASCAR Sprint Cup season and also served as the fourth race in the 2009 Chase for the Sprint Cup. It took place on October 11, 2009, at Auto Club Speedway in the American community of Fontana, California.

Summary
Jimmie Johnson would defeat his Hendrick Motorsports teammate Jeff Gordon by slightly more than 1.6 seconds after a grueling three hours and twenty-eight minutes of racing.

Kyle Busch suffered through three different illnesses during this race; including a non-H1N1 form of the flu. After driving for 62 laps, he felt weak and went into the pits in order for David Gilliland to perform the substitute duty for him. David Gilliland finished the race in 28th place but Busch received the points for it. Mike Bliss walked away as the last-place finisher after encountering engine problems on lap 11.

The Big One struck with six laps to go after Dale Earnhardt Jr. was turned around and collected 8 other cars (including all 4 Richard Petty Motorsports cars). This led to a red flag of almost 22 minutes.

The gambling pundits handpicked Jimmie Johnson to be the winner of the race; with Greg Biffle and Matt Kenseth being wild cards. Just before the race, Johnson had an average finish of 6th place in his 13 prior races at Auto Club Speedway and finished worse than tenth place only twice.

Results

References

Pepsi 500
Pepsi 500
NASCAR races at Auto Club Speedway
October 2009 sports events in the United States